Rush Cricket Club is a cricket club in Rush, County Dublin, Ireland. The club fielded three adult men's teams in 2021 with the first team playing in Division 2 of the Leinster Senior League. The second team are in Division 4. The third team are in Division 11.
The second team won division 5 in 2019. 

Notable former players include Ireland captain William Porterfield and England World Cup winning captain Eoin Morgan. The club has developed a strong youth policy with players being involved in Irish underage sides at all age groups over the winter of 2016/17. The club has won 5 underage titles from 2013-2018 in the U11, U13 and U15 age groups. The first team has also won the National cup on 3 occasions in 2015, 2016 and 2018. The Cricket Leinster winter training squads included 24 players from the club in the various age groups ranging from under 11 to under 17.

References

External links

Cricket clubs in County Dublin
Leinster Senior League (cricket) teams
Sports clubs in Fingal